The All-China Games is a quadrennial national multi-sports event for non-Olympic sports in the People's Republic of China. The events are to "give priority to promoting national physical fitness and providing lots of fun for amateur athletes".

Events include: dragon boat racing, lion dancing, shuai jiao (Chinese wrestling), trampoline, dance sports, bridge, golf, aerobics, water skiing, parachuting, body building and fitness, billiards, chess, xiangqi (Chinese chess), mountaineering and climbing, squash, orienteering, hobby craft, wireless location hunt, bowling, roller sports, open water swimming, tug of war; fin swimming, goal ball, boules, bridge, fin swimming, billiards and "Go (game)".

One of the aims is to promote sport and the whole event is dubbed a "national fitness program". So there are no medal rankings.

The Games are organised by the State General Administration of Sports (SGAS). In the past the games have not been widely publicised .

History   
The second All-China Games were held in 2002 in the city of Ningbo.

The third games ran 20–30 May 2006, and included 28 sports and 268 disciplines .

The 4th All-China Games, held from 16 to 26 May 2010 in Hefei City, Anhui Province, mark a major expansion in terms of the number of participants, up from 4,000 to 30,000.  There will be 34 sports and a new "awarding system" that means that 60 percent of the participants receive some sort of award, though not 3 medals. Hong Kong is sending a team for the first time.

Editions

See also
 China National Youth Games
 National Games of China
 National Peasants' Games
 Sport in China

References 

2000 establishments in China

China
Recurring sporting events established in 2000
Multi-sport events in China
Spring (season) events in China